Dr. Cecile Reynaud is a volleyball educator and retired coach of the Florida State Lady Seminoles volleyball team. After her retirement from coaching she was an associate professor with the sport management program at Florida State University until August, 2015. She also served as an interim assistant athletic director and senior women's administrator at Florida State University from 1994-95. She has served as a television color analyst for collegiate volleyball matches on ACCN, Fox Sports Net South, Sunshine Network and ESPN.

She retired from coaching with over 650 wins.  She is a past president of the American Volleyball Coaches Association.  She is also a past chair of the board for USA Volleyball.

A 1975 graduate of Missouri State University, Reynaud enjoyed an outstanding athletic career on the volleyball team and was twice named among the Outstanding College Athletes in America. In 1983, she was inducted into the school's Women's Athletics Hall of Fame. Reynaud added "Dr." to her name in the spring of 1998 after completing her doctorate degree in athletic administration at Florida State.

Coaching

Florida State University 

As a coach, Reynaud has surpassed many milestones in her 26-year tenure at Florida State. Coach Reynaud notched her 500th career victory in the first match of the 1994 season against Southern Illinois University, placing her among an elite list of coaches in the 500 win club. She reached win number 550 in a three-set win at Florida Atlantic University in 1997 as she led the Lady Seminoles to the program's best ever start at 12-0, and her 600th win over Clemson.

Post season play was familiar to the Lady Seminoles over 26 seasons of volleyball. Florida State (FSU) made 10 NCAA post-season appearances. At the conference level, FSU made three appearances in the Atlantic Coast Conference Championship game in eight years of ACC competition, earning FSU its first ACC crown in 1998. Prior to joining the Atlantic Coast Conference (ACC) in 1992, Reynaud and the Lady Seminoles claimed six regular-season titles and five tournament titles in Metro Conference play from 1976 to 1991. Reynaud's teams have competed in 10 NCAA Tournaments, including eight post-season trips during her last 14 years in the position.

During her 26 years at Florida State, the volleyball program has also boasted one of the highest graduation rates within the athletic department. Among four-year letter winners, all but two student-athletes earned their college degrees while playing for Reynaud.  This accounts for nearly 98 percent of all volleyball student-athletes over those 26 years.  Reynaud’s Seminoles also earned the prestigious Director’s Cup for Service, given annually to the athletic team that performs the most community service hours. The Lady Seminoles donated 636 hours of service to the community in 2000-01.

After her retirement from coaching Dr. Reynaud joined the FSU Sport Management faculty in 2002 and served as the academic advisor for all the master's students and taught 3-4 classes a semester until 2015 when she retired from the University after 39 years.  She continues to teach one online graduate class a semester as an adjunct professor.

USA Volleyball 

In 1983, Reynaud went to the international level and served as the assistant coach at the World University Games in Canada and in 1985 was head coach for the USAV Junior National Team which toured Japan and China. In 2012, she served as the team leader for the USA Women's National Sitting Volleyball Team at the Paralympic Games.  In 2013, she was the team leader/assistant coach for the USA Women's National Team for the FIVB World Grand Prix with competition in Brazil, Serbia, and Japan.  In 2014 she served as the team leader for the Men's USA Volleyball Team at the U21 World Championship in Mexico.

She served as a coordinator at the Olympic Festival for several years and participated in the 1990 Goodwill Games as the Technical Secretary. Highly respected among her peers, Reynaud’s involvement in international competition was taken to an even higher level when she was chosen to serve at the Deputy Competition Manager for the 1996 Centennial Olympic Games in Atlanta, Georgia. As an expert of the game, Reynaud was co-editor of The Volleyball Coaching Bible, which has been heralded as one of the best volleyball coaching books to ever be written.  She is the editor of The Volleyball Coaching Bible, Vol. 2 published in June, 2015. She has produced numerous DVDs and other educational material pertaining to volleyball.

Reynaud is also a certified USA Volleyball Coaching Accreditation Program (CAP) instructor and conducts coaching clinics all over the United States.  She also served as an FIVB Coach Clinician.

She is a past member of the USA Volleyball Board of Directors and serves on the NORCECA Coaches Commission.

Memberships 

She has been on the American Volleyball Coaches Association (AVCA) All-America Committee and was the Zone Coordinator for 1986 and 1987 Olympic Festivals. She continued to serve as the commissioner for the Olympic Festival for several years. Reynaud is spent 12 years on the USVBA Board of Directors and Executive Committee previously and is now serving a second time on the USA Volleyball Board of Directors.

Dr. Reynaud served as president of the AVCA in 1989 and 1990 after serving a two-year term as the awards chair in 1986 and 1987. She was again been appointed to the AVCA Board of Directors overseeing Education and Publications for the association and served from 2005-2016. She has remained an active member of the AVCA, even after retirement from coaching. She presents annually at the convention as well as serving as emcee of the Tachikara/AVCA Coach of the Year and Victory Club Award Banquet and AVCA All-America/Players of the Year Banquet. She served as President of the Alliance of Women Coaches (now WeCOACH) and was a member of the FSU Varsity Club Board of Directors as well as the Side-out Foundation Board of Directors.  Locally she served as a Commissioner on the Tallahassee/Leon County Commission on the Status of Women and Girls. Dr. Reynaud also served as president of the Refuge House Board of Directors, a local domestic and sexual abuse shelter for 4 years and on the board for 10 years.

Personal life 
Reynaud married oceanographer and Graduate School Dean Nancy Marcus circa 1992.

Awards and accolades

As a player

 Outstanding College Athletes in America - 1973, 1975
 Southwest Missouri State University Women's Athletic Hall of Fame Inductee - 1983

As a coach

 Nominated as an Outstanding Woman in America - 1982
 Volleyball Coach of the Year by the Florida Association of Intercollegiate Athletics for Women - 1981
 Metro Conference Coach of the Year 1988, 1989
 American Volleyball Coaches Association South Region Coach of the Year - 1989
 ACC Coach of the Year - 1992, 2000
 George J. Fisher Leader in Volleyball by USA Volleyball - 1996
 St. Leo University Women in Sports Achievement Award - 2005
 Webster Groves High School Athletic Hall of Fame - 2006
 Florida State University Athletic Hall of Fame - 2009
 USA Volleyball Florida Region Hall of Fame - 2011
 USA Volleyball Harold T. Friermood "Frier" Award Winner - 2016
 Missouri State University "Bear of Excellence" Award Winner - 2017
 American Volleyball Coaches Association Hall of Fame - 2017
 USA Volleyball Bertha Lucas "All Time Great Coach" - 2020
 USA Volleyball Founder's Award - 2022

Bibliography

Books
 Coaching Volleyball: Technical and Tactical Skills Publisher:  Human Kinetics, Inc. (2011)  
 101 Winning Volleyball Drills Publisher:  Coaches Choice (2008)  
 She Can Coach!''' (Editor)  Publisher: Human Kinetics, Inc. (2005) 
 The Volleyball Coaching Bible (Co-Editor)  Publisher: Human Kinetics, Inc. (2002) 
 The Volleyball Coaching Bible, Vol. 2 (Editor)  Publisher: Human Kinetics, Inc. (2015)  
 Coach Education Essentials (Ch. 8 - College and High-Level Amateur Sports) Publisher:  Human Kinetics, Inc. (2020) 
 Winning Ways of Women Coaches (Editor) Publisher: Human Kinetics, Inc. (2022)  

DVDs

 Coaches Choice Volleyball DVD Series 
 101 Winning Volleyball Drills  Publisher:  Coaches Choice
 20 Keys to Great Defense  Publisher: Coaches Choice 
 Coaching Volleyball:  Team Offense  Publisher:  Coaches Choice
 Coaching Volleyball:  Team Defense  Publisher:  Coaches Choice
 Coaching Volleyball:  Organizing and Conducting Practice  Publisher:  Coaches Choice
 Coaching Volleyball:  Individual Defense  Publisher:  Coaches Choice
 Coaching Volleyball:  Effective Practice Drills  Publisher:  Coaches Choice
 Coaching Individual Volleyball Skills and Techniques  Publisher:  Coaches Choice
 Reading and Decision Making in Volleyball''  Publisher: Championship Productions

References

Florida State University alumni
American women's volleyball players
American volleyball coaches
Florida State University faculty
Living people
1953 births
American LGBT sportspeople
LGBT people from Iowa
LGBT academics
Lesbian sportswomen
LGBT volleyball players
American women academics
21st-century LGBT people
21st-century American women